Meleni Rodney, OLY (born 27 June 1998) is a Grenadian sprinter who specialises in the 400 metres.

She participated at the Summer Youth Olympics in 2014 and received a bronze medal. In that same year she was named athlete of the year along with Kirani James. In 2016, she was a part of the women's 4×400m Relay team which secured a Silver Medal at the 2016 OECS Track & Field Championships with teammates Amanda Crawford, Kenisha Pascal and Kanika Beckles.

In 2017 Meleni experience a return to form resulting in improvements in her personal best in the 200m at the Norcal finals as well in the 400m dash at the CCCAA California State Championships.

After recording a personal best time in the 400m at the 2019 Rafer Johnson/Jackie Joyner-Kersee Invitational Meleni was named Pac-12 Athlete of the Week

On 26 May 2020 Meleni was one of 12 UCLA Bruins who received USTFCCCA Indoor All-America Accolades as part of the Women's 4x400m Relay team.

Competition record

Personal bests
Outdoor
200 metres – 23.25 (De Anza – Cupertino, CA 2017)
400 metres – 51.32 (Drake Stadium – Los Angeles, CA 2021)
200 (Indoor) metres – 23.92 (Dempsey Indoor, Seattle WA , USA 2018)
400 (Indoor) metres – 53.80 (Dempsey Indoor, Seattle WA , USA 2018)

References

External links

 http://www.rtspt.com/events/mtsac/2017/170413F202.htm

1998 births
Living people
Grenadian female sprinters
Athletes (track and field) at the 2014 Summer Youth Olympics
Athletes (track and field) at the 2020 Summer Olympics
Olympic female sprinters
Olympic athletes of Grenada